Rosston is a town in Harper County, Oklahoma, United States. The population was 31 at the 2010 census.

The Old Settler's Irrigation Ditch near Rosston is on the National Register of Historic Places listings in Beaver County, Oklahoma.

Geography
Rosston is located at  (36.812364, -99.933401).

Demographics

As of the census of 2000, there were 66 people, 23 households, and 14 families residing in the town. There were 29 housing units at an average density of 90.2 per square mile (35.0/km2). The racial makeup of the town was 98.48% White, 1.52% from other races. Hispanic or Latino of any race were 10.61% of the population.

There were 23 households, out of which 26.1% had children under the age of 18 living with them, 43.5% were married couples living together, 4.3% had a female householder with no husband present, and 34.8% were non-families. 30.4% of all households were made up of individuals, and 17.4% had someone living alone who was 65 years of age or older. The average household size was 2.87 and the average family size was 3.73.

In the town, the population was spread out, with 39.4% under the age of 18, 3.0% from 18 to 24, 21.2% from 25 to 44, 28.8% from 45 to 64, and 7.6% who were 65 years of age or older. The median age was 32 years. For every 100 females, there were 127.6 males. For every 100 females age 18 and over, there were 110.5 males.

The median income for a household in the town was $39,167, and the median income for a family was $42,500. Males had a median income of $23,000 versus $21,250 for females. The per capita income for the town was $7,297. There were 11.1% of families and 11.2% of the population living below the poverty line, including 7.4% of under eighteens and 33.3% of those over 64.

References

Towns in Harper County, Oklahoma
Towns in Oklahoma